João Belo, now known as Xai-Xai, is the capital of Gaza Province, Mozambique.

João Belo may also refer to:

João Belo-class frigate, class of Frigate of French design
João Belo (footballer) (1920–deceased), Portuguese footballer who played as a defender